Acineta superba is a species of orchid and the type species of the genus Acineta found in Venezuela, Colombia, Ecuador and Peru.

References

External links
 
 

superba
Orchids of Colombia
Orchids of Ecuador
Orchids of Peru
Orchids of Venezuela